K'Lavon Chaisson (born July 25, 1999) is an American football outside linebacker for the Jacksonville Jaguars of the National Football League (NFL). He played college football at LSU and was drafted by the Jaguars in the first round of the 2020 NFL Draft.

Early life and high school
Chaisson was born and grew up in Houston, Texas and attended North Shore Senior High School. He quit playing football as a freshman in order to focus on basketball, but returned to football as a junior. He became an immediate starter at defensive end for the Mustangs, leading Texas high schoolers with 15.5 sacks along with 50 tackles, including 13 for loss, and forced three fumbles and helped lead North Shore to the Class 6A Division I state championship game and was named first-team All-State by the Associated Press. Chaisson was named the defensive MVP of the game after recording two sacks, four tackles for loss, a blocked kick and a forced fumble in the game and making a game-saving tackle at fourth and goal to preserve a 21–14 win over Todd Dodge's Westlake High School. 

As a senior, Chaisson was named the 21-6A district defensive MVP as well as included on the Scout.com All-Midlands team and was invited to the 2017 Under Armour All-America Game. In the game he recorded six tackles, five of which were for loss, and tied the game's record with three sacks. Rated a five star recruit by Scout.com and four star by 247Sports, ESPN and Rivals, Chaisson committed to play college football at LSU over offers from Florida and Texas.

College career
As a true freshman, Chaisson started the first game of the Tigers' season against BYU and recorded his first two career sacks in the next game during a 45–10 win over Chattanooga. He was named to the Southeastern Conference All-Freshman team after finishing the season with 27 tackles, two sacks and 4.5 tackles for loss in 12 games played (three starts). Named a starter at outside linebacker going into his sophomore season, Chaisson made five tackles with a sack, a tackle for loss and a quarterback hurry in the season opener against Miami before suffering a knee injury in the fourth quarter. He was diagnosed with a torn ACL the following day, ending his season and forcing him to use a medical redshirt.

Chaisson was chosen to wear the No. 18 Jersey by the Tigers' coaching staff going into his redshirt sophomore season. He finished the season with 60 tackles and led the team with 6.5 sacks, 13.5 tackles for loss, and six quarterback hurries along with two passes broken up and a forced fumble and was named first-team All-SEC. Chaisson was named the Defensive MVP of the 2019 Peach Bowl after a six-tackle, two-sack performance against Oklahoma. Chaisson had two tackles in LSU's 42–25 win over Clemson in the 2020 National Championship Game. On January 17, 2020, Chaisson announced that he would forgo his remaining two years of eligibility and enter the 2020 NFL Draft.  He finished his college career with 92 total tackles, including 19 for loss, 9.5 sacks, and 1 forced fumble.

Professional career

Chaisson was selected with the 20th pick in the 2020 NFL draft by the Jacksonville Jaguars, using a pick previously acquired from the Los Angeles Rams in a trade for Jalen Ramsey. He made his debut in the 2020 season opener against the Indianapolis Colts, making two tackles. Chaisson recorded the first and only sack of the season in the following week against the Tennessee Titans.

On October 11, 2022, Chaisson was placed on injured reserve with a knee injury. He was activated on December 10.

NFL career statistics

Personal life
Chaisson's father, Kelvin Chaisson, played linebacker at Baylor University. Kelvin Chaisson was shot and killed in 2014 at the age of 33 when K'Lavon was a sophomore in high school.

References

External links
Jacksonville Jaguars bio
LSU Tigers bio

1999 births
Living people
Players of American football from Houston
American football outside linebackers
American football defensive ends
LSU Tigers football players
Under Armour All-American football players
Jacksonville Jaguars players